Anthony Green may refer to:
Anthony Green (actor) (born 1970), British actor
Anthony Green (musician) (born 1982), lead vocalist of Circa Survive and Saosin
Anthony Green (painter) (1939–2023), English realist painter and printmaker
Antony Green (born 1960), election commentator

See also
Tony Green (disambiguation)